Gusay Al-Shelali (born 14 February 1992) is a Saudi Arabian footballer who plays as a midfielder for Al-Qadsiah.

References

External links
 

Living people
1992 births
Saudi Arabian footballers
Association football midfielders
Ittihad FC players
S.C. Beira-Mar players
Al-Qadsiah FC players
Jeddah Club players
Ohod Club players
Al-Shoulla FC players
Najran SC players
Saudi Arabian expatriate sportspeople in Portugal
Saudi Arabian expatriate footballers
Sportspeople from Jeddah
Saudi Professional League players
Saudi First Division League players